Heer is a Pakistani Urdu-language television series. It stars Madiha Imam as Heer, a progressive village girl who wants to change the lives of the women of her village. The series first aired on 25 January 2016 on Geo Entertainment.

Plot summary 
Heer, an educated girl, inspires the fellow-women of her village to work and be financially independent. This doesn't go down well with the menfolk and they target Heer till she leaves the village.

Cast 
 Madiha Imam as Heer as Heer
 Yasir Ali Khan as Aabis
 Asad Siddiqui as Ibrahim
 Seemi Pasha as Aabis's mother
 Zaheen Tahira as Aabis' aunt
 Azra Mansoor as Aabis's grandmother
 Bigul Hussain
 Dania Enwer 
 Syed Saim Ali
 Majida Hameed
 Javed Jamal
 Aslam Sheikh as Chaudhry Sahab
 Seema Khan as Kulsoom
 Humaira Zahid

References

External links 
 

Pakistani drama television series
2015 Pakistani television series debuts